The Cocos Islands mutiny was a failed mutiny by Sri Lankan soldiers against British officers, on the Cocos (Keeling) Islands on 8 May 1942, during the Second World War.

The mutineers attempted to seize control of the islands and disable the British garrison. It was claimed that the mutineers also planned to transfer the islands to the Empire of Japan. However, the mutiny was defeated, the mutineers punished, and the three ringleaders executed; the only British Commonwealth servicemen to be executed for mutiny during the Second World War.

Background 

Units belonging to the Ceylon Defence Force (CDF), including the Ceylon Garrison Artillery (CGA), the Ceylon Light Infantry (CLI) and the Ceylon Volunteer Medical Corps, were mobilised on 2 September 1939, the day before Britain declared war on Nazi Germany. The CGA was equipped with six-inch (152 mm) and nine-inch (227 mm) guns. Several of them were posted to the Seychelles and the Cocos Islands, accompanied by contingents of the CLI and the Medical Corps. The full contingent to Cocos Islands of the CDF was around 75 personnel and was under the command of Captain George Gardiner, an accountant of an export firm in Colombo at the outbreak of war, he had obtained an emergency war commission. Two six-inch guns were deployed on Horsburgh Island, Cocos Atoll, as well as a platoon of the King's African Rifles.

The sinking of Prince of Wales and Repulse and the subsequent fall of Singapore did to British and Imperial forces what Pearl Harbor had to the Americans: compromised their ability to defend their interests north of Australia and east of India. The Japanese raids into the Indian Ocean, resulting in the loss of two cruisers and the aircraft carrier Hermes, threw Allied war plans in the entire Southwest Pacific Area into chaos.

With the Japanese successes, public sentiment on Ceylon increased in favour of the Japanese; encouraged by successful Japanese-trained and -directed rebellions in Indonesia and support for Japanese forces in Thailand, Sinkiang and the Philippines, many Ceylonese hoped that the Japanese would help them gain independence. At this time a young J.R. Jayawardene, later to be President of Sri Lanka, held discussions with the Japanese with this aim in mind. However, this was immediately stopped by D S Senanayake who collaborated with the Colonial Government, being rewarded with the Premiership, being hand-picked to lead the post-colonial government after 1948.

Mutiny 
On the night of 8 May, 30 out of 56 personnel of the Ceylon Garrison Artillery on Horsburgh Island in the Cocos Islands mutinied, intending to hand the islands over to the Japanese. The plan was to arrest Captain Gardiner, the British Battery Commanding Officer and his deputy, Lieutenant Stephens, disarm the troops loyal to the British Empire, turn the 6-inch guns on the CLI troops on Direction Island, and to signal the Japanese on Christmas Island, which the Japanese had occupied on 3 March 1942.

However, the soldiers all proved to be poor shots with small arms: one soldier, Gunner Samaris Jayasekera was killed, and Lieutenant Stephens wounded by them, and the rebels' sole Bren gun jammed at a crucial moment as Gratien Fernando, the leader of the mutiny, had it aimed at Gardiner. The rebels then attempted to turn the 6-inch guns on Direction Island, but were overpowered.

Messages sent by Fernando were received in Ceylon, indicating that there was co-operation between him and both the CLI troops and the Australian signalers on Direction Island, however, none of them took part in the mutiny. The CLI helped to put down the mutineers. He declared he had surrendered on condition that he would be tried in Colombo; it may be that he intended to give a speech from the dock to inspire his compatriots. However, the 15 mutineers were court-martialed on the Cocos Islands by Gardiner. Seven of the men who were found guilty were sentenced to death, with four of these sentences commuted to terms of imprisonment. Gunner Samaris Jayasekera was buried with full military honours on Horsburgh Island on the evening of 10 May and later reburied in Singapore's Kranji War Memorial.

The condemned mutineers were shipped back to Ceylon, imprisoned at the military jail in Flagstaff Street and then at military detention barracks at Hulftsdorp. The families of the condemned appealed to Sir Oliver Goonetilleke, then Civil Defence Commissioner and a member of the War Council to save them, H. W. Amarasuriya and Susantha de Fonseka, members of the State Council, also made representations to the Governor Sir Andrew Caldecott and Admiral Geoffrey Layton, requesting clemency. However, their pleas failed.

Fernando was defiant to the end, confidently believing that he would be remembered as a patriot, and refused a commutation of punishment. He was executed on 5 August 1942 at Welikada Prison, and two other mutineers shortly thereafter.

Aftermath 
The three mutineers were the only British Commonwealth troops to be executed for mutiny during the Second World War. The CDF detachment in Cocos Islands returned just before Christmas 1942, these veterans had their promotions suspended and denied the campaign medals for active war service. No Ceylonese combat regiment was deployed by the British in a combat situation after the Cocos Islands Mutiny. However, support units were deployed, most notably in North Africa. The defences of Ceylon were increased to three British army divisions because the island was strategically important, holding almost all the British Empire's resources of rubber that remained after the fall of Malaya. Rationing was instituted so that the Ceylonese were comparatively better fed than their Indian neighbours, in order to prevent disaffection among the natives.

The LSSP's anti-colonial agitation now included references to the Cocos Islands Mutiny as public opposition at British colonial rule continued to grow. Sir Oliver Ernest Goonetilleke, the Civil Defence Commissioner claimed that the British commander of Ceylon, Admiral Sir Geoffrey Layton called him a 'black bastard'.

Mutineers 
The men who were convicted by court martial of mutiny were:
 Bombardier Gratien Fernando (executed 5 August 1942)
 Gunner Carlo Augustus Gauder (executed 7 August 1942)
 Gunner G. Benny de Silva (executed 8 August 1942)
 Gunner R. S. Hamilton — death sentence commuted to penal servitude for three years
 Lance Bombardier Kingsley W. J. Diasz — death sentence commuted to penal servitude for four years
 Gunner A. Joseph L. Peries — death sentence commuted to penal servitude for four years
 Gunner Gerry D. Anandappa — death sentence commuted to penal servitude for three years
 Gunner A. B. Edema — imprisonment for one year without hard labour
 Gunner M. A. Hopman — penal servitude for three years
 Gunner F. J. Daniels — penal servitude for seven years
 Gunner Kenneth R. Porritt — imprisonment for one year with hard labour

Notes

References 
 Arsecularatne, SN, Sinhalese immigrants in Malaysia & Singapore, 1860-1990: History through recollections, KVG de Silva & Sons, Colombo, 1991
 Crusz, Noel, The Cocos Islands Mutiny, Fremantle Arts Centre Press, Fremantle, WA, 2001
 
 Muthiah, Wesley and Wanasinghe, Sydney, Britain, World War 2 and the Sama Samajists, Young Socialist Publication, Colombo, 1996

External links 
 The Cocos Mutiny, 66 years on, as recalled by (Donny) Vincent Ranasinghe, the last surviving member of the Ceylon Garrison Artillery (CGA) who served on the island
 Cocos Islands Mutiny, transcript of Robyn Williams' radio broadcast, 20 May 2001

Conflicts in 1942
History of the Cocos (Keeling) Islands
Military history of Australia during World War II
Ceylon Defence Force
Mutinies in World War II
Events that led to courts-martial
Sri Lankan independence movement
British Malaya in World War II
May 1942 events